Dreamchasers is the eighth mixtape by American rapper Meek Mill (hosted by DJ Drama). It was released on August 11, 2011, by Maybach Music Group and on professional mixtape website DatPiff and is the first installment in the Dreamchasers series. Dreamchasers features guest appearances by American rappers Young Chris, Rick Ross, Beanie Sigel, Mel Love, NH, Yo Gotti, and Young Pooh. Production includes A One, All Star, The Beat Bully, Jahlil Beats, and Lex Luger.

Reception

Critical response 

Upon its release Dreamchasers received generally positive reviews from music critics. Jordan Sargent of Pitchfork Media gave the mixtape a 7.4 out of 10, saying "There are plenty of mid-tier rappers willing to merely ride out Lex Luger's wave, but Meek has enough dimensions to be in it for the long haul." Carl Chery of XXL gave the mixtape an XL, saying "Calling Dreamchasers a classic may be a bit of a stretch, but it undoubtedly precipitates anticipation for Meek’s eventual debut." Edwin Ortiz of HipHopDX gave the mixtape a positive review, saying "Dream Chasers is an extension of what Meek Mill solidified on Self Made Vol. 1: a young hungry emcee who has found the right supporting cast to push his brand of Rap. In any case, Meek Mill should have changed the title of this project, because frankly it seems like his dreams are fast becoming reality."

Track listing

References 

2011 mixtape albums
Meek Mill albums
Albums produced by Lex Luger
Albums produced by Aone
Albums produced by Jahlil Beats
Albums produced by Noah "40" Shebib
Albums produced by Southside (record producer)
Albums produced by T-Minus (record producer)
Albums produced by TM88
Albums produced by Cardiak